Floe Lake is a lake in Kootenay National Park, British Columbia, Canada. The lake is only accessible by a 10.7 km  hiking trail that leaves from a marked trailhead on highway 93.

There is a backcountry campground at the lake as well as a Warden's cabin staffed by Parks Canada.

An image of Floe Lake appears on the wall of the International Arrivals at Customs Canada in the Calgary International Airport.

References

Lakes of British Columbia
Kootenay National Park